Takala is a Finnish surname. Notable people with the surname include:

Juho Takala (1902–1982), Finnish schoolteacher and politician
Rudy Takala, American writer
Tuomas Takala (born 1984), Finnish ice hockey player
Tuuli Takala (born 1987), Finnish classical singer and operatic soprano
Eufenio Takala, king of Sigave

Finnish-language surnames